Highway to Heaven is an American television drama series which ran on NBC from 1984 to 1989.

Series overview

Episodes

Season 1 (1984–85) 
The Pilot was filmed from March to April 1984; Season 1 was filmed from August 1984 to March 1985.

Season 2 (1985–86) 
Season 2 was filmed from July 1985 to March 1986.

Season 3 (1986–87) 
It's presently unclear when Season 3 began filming, but it can be confirmed that filming wrapped in March 1987.

Season 4 (1987–88) 
Season 4 was filmed from May 1987 to March 1988.

Season 5 (1988–89) 
Season 5 was filmed from August to December 1988.

References 

Lists of American drama television series episodes